Else Freiin von Richthofen (October 8, 1874 – December 22, 1973) was among the early female social scientists in Germany.

Life and career
Elisabeth Helene Amalie Sophie Freiin (Baroness) von Richthofen (also known as Else Jaffé) was born into the German nobility at Château-Salins (France). Her father was Friedrich Ernst Emil Ludwig Freiherr von Richthofen (1844–1915), an engineer in the Imperial German Army, and Anna Elise Lydia Marquier (1852–1930).

While Else von Richthofen started her professional career as a teacher, she enrolled at Heidelberg University at a time when this was still very unusual for women; she was one of just four female students at the time. She earned a doctorate in economics in 1901 and started to work as a labour inspector in Karlsruhe. 

She married  (1865–1921), another former student of Max Weber, in 1902, and he was a well-known economist and entrepreneur. It was Jaffé who bought the journal Archiv für Sozialwissenschaft und Sozialpolitik of which Max Weber became one of the editors. With Jaffé, she had three children, Friedel (born 1903), Marianne (born 1905) and Hans (born 1909). 

Else became acquainted to intellectuals and authors, including the sociologists and economists Max Weber and Alfred Weber, the psychoanalyst Otto Gross, the writer Fanny zu Reventlow and others. She started an affair with Otto Gross with whom she had a fourth child, Peter (1907–ca. 1915). She also had an affair with her former professor Max Weber and his brother Alfred Weber, with whom she lived together in the same house for several years after her husband died.

References

Further reading
Janet Byrne: A Genius for Living - A Biography of Frieda Lawrence, Bloomsbury, 1995.
Green, Martin Burgess: The Von Richthofen Sisters

External links 
finding aid for Else von Richthofen papers, 1898-1985 at Tufts Digital Collections and Archives

German baronesses
Else von Richthofen
1874 births
1973 deaths